Zahurul Haq (9 February 1935 –  15 February 1969) was a Pakistan Air Force sergeant. He was one of the 35 persons accused in the Agartala Conspiracy Case in 1969. He was killed in custody and his death led to increase in 1969 uprising in East Pakistan. He received the Independence Day Award from the Government of Bangladesh in 2018.

Early life
Haq was born on 9 February 1935 in Sonapur, Sudharam (now Noakhali Sadar Upazila), Noakhali. He completed his matriculation from Noakhali Zilla School in 1953 and intermediate and B.Sc in Physics from Jagannath College.

Agartala Conspiracy Case
Haq joined Pakistan Air Force in 1957 as an Airman and reached the rank of a Sergeant. He was arrested in December 1967 in accusation of a conspiracy to cause an uprising in East Pakistan with the intention of bringing about the secession of the province from the rest of Pakistan. He was confined in Dhaka Central Jail and later, was transferred to Dhaka Cantonment in Kurmitola. In January 1968, Awami League leader Sheikh Mujibur Rahman's name was added to the case. A special tribunal was set headed by a West Pakistani Justice S. A. Rahman, with two other Bengali judges Justice Mujibur Rahman Khan and Justice Maksum-ul-Hakim. Barrister Abul Khair Khan served on the legal panel in this Agartala Conspiracy Case as a lawyer for Sergeant Zahurul Haq. The final date for the case was set to 6 February 1969 and the date was deferred later. On 15 February 1969, he was shot by a Pakistani Havildar. He was taken to the Combined Military Hospital and died at around 10 pm.

Legacy
Haq's death led to more street protests and state guest house and other government buildings were burned down which led to the withdrawal of the Agartala Conspiracy Case on 22 February 1969. "February 15 Bahini", the first armed force was formed and consisted of student leaders.

Haq was a painter. Some of his paintings are displayed in Bangladesh National Museum. Sergeant Zahurul Haq Hall of the University of Dhaka is named after him. BAF Zahurul Haq base, a Bangladesh Air Force base is named after him.

Haq's eldest brother, Aminul Haque (d. 1995) became the Attorney General of Bangladesh.

References

1935 births
1969 deaths
People from Noakhali District
Pakistan Air Force personnel
Bangladeshi activists
Causes and prelude of the Bangladesh Liberation War
Protest-related deaths
Recipients of the Independence Day Award
H